Pak Sha Wan is a village in the Hebe Haven (Pak Sha Wan) area of Sai Kung District, Hong Kong.

External links

 Delineation of area of existing village Pak Sha Wan (Sai Kung) for election of resident representative (2019 to 2022)

Villages in Sai Kung District, Hong Kong